August Holmgren (born 22 April 1998) is a Danish professional tennis player.

Holmgren has a career high ATP singles ranking of World No. 508 achieved on 17 October 2022.

Holmgren represents Denmark at the Davis Cup, where he has a W/L record of 3–0.

Career
Holmgren made his ATP debut at the 2021 San Diego Open after receiving a lucky loser spot into the main draw after 3rd seed Félix Auger-Aliassime withdrew. There, he lost to former world No. 3 Grigor Dimitrov in straight sets.

References

External links

August Holmgren at University of San Diego

1998 births
Living people
Danish male tennis players
San Diego Toreros men's tennis players
People from Helsingør Municipality
Sportspeople from the Capital Region of Denmark
21st-century Danish people